Greichaly Cepero (born June 11, 1981) is a volleyball player who played collegiately for Nebraska.

Early life
Cepero was born June 11, 1981, to Pedro Cepero and Maria Juan Febres in Río Piedras, Puerto Rico. Her name came from "Greicha," which means Greece in Puerto Rican, because her father hoped she would one day play in the Olympics. She played both basketball and volleyball at McDonogh School in Owings Mills, Maryland. In volleyball she helped lead McDonogh to an undefeated season, which resulted in a No. 25 national ranking by USA Today.

College 
Several schools, including Rice, Connecticut, UCLA and Nebraska recruited Cepero; she chose Nebraska. She played volleyball all four years and basketball for three years. She was a setter in volleyball, but at 6′2″, she was able to block as well, not normally done by setters. She won the AVCA player of the year in 2000, was a two time All-American. She helped lead the team to the National Championship in 2000, where she was named the tournament's Most Outstanding Player.  In 2001, she was the winner of the Honda Sports Award, given to the nation's top female collegiate volleyball player.

Honors and awards 
 Gatorade Circle of Champions Maryland High School Volleyball Player-of-the-Year Award
American Volleyball Coaches Association Player of the Year (2000)
Honda Sports Award for volleyball (2001)

See also

Nebraska Cornhuskers women's volleyball

References/Notes and references

Living people
1981 births
Nebraska Cornhuskers women's volleyball players
Setters (volleyball)